Enga Rasi Nalla Rasi is a 2009 Indian Tamil language comedy film, by the duo Ravi-Raja and produced by R. P. Poorani. The film stars Murali, Vishwa, Reethima and  S. V. Shekhar. The film was a remake of Telugu film Oka Radha Iddaru Krishnula Pelli (2003). Enga Rasi Nalla Rasi opened to negative reviews.

Cast

Murali as Vijay
Vishwa as Vishwa
Reethima as Aishwarya / Malathi
S. V. Shekhar as Sivashankar
G. Ramachandran as Vijay's father
Livingston as Pandian
Charle as Bala
Chinni Jayanth as Bala's father
Vineetha as Chandramukhi
Jaya Rekha
Kanaga Priya 
Bayilvan Ranganathan 
Suruli Manohar
Chelladurai
Mohan Raman as Police inspector
Abhinayashree as Special appearance

Production 
This film marks the return of Murali after a brief hiatus. Bharathi opted out of the film due to marriage plans. This was the last film of actress Vineetha.

Soundtrack 
The music is composed by Deva.

References

External links
 

2009 films
Tamil remakes of Telugu films
Films scored by Deva (composer)
2000s Tamil-language films